United States Public Health Service Syphilis Studies can refer to:

 Guatemala syphilis experiments
 Terre Haute prison experiments
 Tuskegee Syphilis Study

African-American history of Alabama
Clinical trials
Health disasters in the United States
History of racism in Alabama
Human rights abuses in the United States
Human subject research in the United States
Medical ethics
Medical scandals in the United States
Race and health in the United States
Social problems in medicine
Syphilis
Tuskegee University
United States Public Health Service
Medical experimentation on prisoners
1946 in Guatemala
1947 in Guatemala
1948 in Guatemala
Guatemala–United States relations
Human subject research in Guatemala
Medical scandals